This was the twentieth season of the League Cup, known as the Regal Trophy for sponsorship reasons.

The final was won by Warrington, who beat Bradford Northern 12-2 in the match played at Headingley, Leeds. The attendance was 11,154 and receipts were £57662.

Background 
This season saw no changes in the  entrants, no new members and no withdrawals, the number remaining at thirty-eight.

The preliminary round involved twelve clubs, to reduce the numbers to entrants to the  first round proper to thirty-two.

Competition and results

Preliminary round 
Involved  2 matches and 4 clubs

Round 1 - First  Round 
Involved  16 matches and 32 clubs

Round 1 - First  Round replays 
Involved  xx matches and xx Clubs

Round 2 - Second  Round 
Involved  8 matches and 16 clubs

Round 3 -Quarter-finals 
Involved 4 matches with 8 clubs

Round 4 – Semi-finals 
Involved 2 matches and 4 clubs

Final

Teams and scorers 

Scoring - Try = four points - Goal = two points - Drop goal = one point

Prize money 
As part of the sponsorship deal and funds, the  prize money awarded to the competing teams for this season is as follows :-

The road to success 
This tree excludes any preliminary round fixtures

Notes and comments 
1 * Bradford Dudley Hill are a Junior (amateur) club from Bradford
2 * Saddleworth Rangers are a Junior (amateur) club from Oldham
3 * Egremont are a Junior (amateur) club from Cumbria
4 * At this time Fulham were a bit nomadic, using a collection of grounds as their "home", but the  likelihood was that this match was probably played at Chiswick Polytechnic Sports Ground
5 * RUGBYLEAGUEproject and Rothmans yearbook 1991-92 give the score as 6-35 but Wigan official archives gives it as 6-5, which must be a misprint as Batley were the team progressing to the next round
6  * Headingley, Leeds, is the home ground of Leeds RLFC with a capacity of 21,000. The record attendance was  40,175 for a league match between Leeds and Bradford Northern on 21 May 1947.

General information for those unfamiliar 
The council of the Rugby Football League voted to introduce a new competition, to be similar to The Football Association and Scottish Football Association's "League Cup". It was to be a similar knock-out structure to, and to be secondary to, the Challenge Cup. As this was being formulated, sports sponsorship was becoming more prevalent and as a result John Player and Sons, a division of Imperial Tobacco Company, became sponsors, and the competition never became widely known as the "League Cup" 
The competition ran from 1971-72 until 1995-96 and was initially intended for the professional clubs plus the two amateur BARLA National Cup finalists. In later seasons the entries were expanded to take in other amateur and French teams. The competition was dropped due to "fixture congestion" when Rugby League became a summer sport
The Rugby League season always (until the onset of "Summer Rugby" in 1996) ran from around August-time through to around May-time and this competition always took place early in the season, in the Autumn, with the final usually taking place in late January 
The competition was variably known, by its sponsorship name, as the Player's No.6 Trophy (1971–1977), the John Player Trophy (1977–1983), the John Player Special Trophy (1983–1989), and the Regal Trophy in 1989.

See also 
1990-91 Rugby Football League season
1990 Lancashire Cup
1990 Yorkshire Cup
John Player Special Trophy
Rugby league county cups

References

External links
Saints Heritage Society
1896–97 Northern Rugby Football Union season at wigan.rlfans.com 
Hull&Proud Fixtures & Results 1896/1897
Widnes Vikings - One team, one passion Season In Review - 1896-97
The Northern Union at warringtonwolves.org
Huddersfield R L Heritage
Wakefield until I die

1990 in English rugby league
1991 in English rugby league
League Cup (rugby league)